Ray Lathon, (October 27, 1966, in St. Louis, Missouri – December 12, 2000, in St. Louis) was an American boxer.

Amateur career
Known as "Lethal", Lathon was a stellar amateur and, in 1989, he was the U.S. Amateur Middleweight champion and won the Golden Gloves and USA Boxing titles. He also fought as part of Team USA at the World Championships in Moscow.

Professional career
Lathon turned professional in 1990, and suffered his only professional defeat to Montell Griffin in 1994. Lathon's career record is a 22-1 with 21 knockouts overall.

Murder
On December 12, 2000, after finishing a workout in a St. Louis gym, Lathon was shot and killed execution-style by a masked gunman. Lathon had been in training for an upcoming attempt at the NABF Cruiserweight title. Ahmad Adisa, age 27, was convicted of first-degree murder and sentenced to life in prison without parole. At his trial, evidence suggested that Adisa was hired to kill Lathon for a $10,000 payment, though no one else has been charged in the case. Assistant Circuit Attorney Dwight Warren told jurors that Lathon was killed in retaliation for his suspected involvement in the kidnapping and torture of a drug dealer in 1999. Authorities said the drug dealer was beaten and burned with cigarettes, but Lathon was never charged.

Professional boxing record

|-
|align="center" colspan=8|23 Wins (21 knockouts, 2 decisions), 1 Loss (1 decision)
|-
| align="center" style="border-style: none none solid solid; background: #e3e3e3"|Result
| align="center" style="border-style: none none solid solid; background: #e3e3e3"|Record
| align="center" style="border-style: none none solid solid; background: #e3e3e3"|Opponent
| align="center" style="border-style: none none solid solid; background: #e3e3e3"|Type
| align="center" style="border-style: none none solid solid; background: #e3e3e3"|Round
| align="center" style="border-style: none none solid solid; background: #e3e3e3"|Date
| align="center" style="border-style: none none solid solid; background: #e3e3e3"|Location
| align="center" style="border-style: none none solid solid; background: #e3e3e3"|Notes
|-align=center
|Win
|
|align=left| Rodney McSwain
|UD
|8
|10/10/2000
|align=left| The Spotlight, Saint Louis, Missouri
|align=left|
|-
|Win
|
|align=left| Reggie Miller
|KO
|2
|08/02/2000
|align=left| The Spotlight, Saint Louis, Missouri
|align=left|
|-
|Win
|
|align=left| Kevin Robertson
|TKO
|1
|07/12/1999
|align=left| The Spotlight, Saint Louis, Missouri
|align=left|
|-
|Win
|
|align=left| Onebo Maxime
|KO
|1
|25/06/1999
|align=left| Station Casino, Saint Louis, Missouri
|align=left|
|-
|Win
|
|align=left| Rocky Bentley
|TKO
|1
|04/05/1999
|align=left| The Ambassador, Saint Louis, Missouri
|align=left|
|-
|Win
|
|align=left| Tracy Barrios
|KO
|3
|26/01/1999
|align=left| UAW Hall, Saint Louis, Missouri
|align=left|
|-
|Win
|
|align=left| Harry "Heatwave" Daniels
|KO
|1
|17/11/1998
|align=left| UAW Hall, Saint Louis, Missouri
|align=left|
|-
|Win
|
|align=left| Booker T Word
|KO
|2
|15/09/1998
|align=left| UAW Hall, Saint Louis, Missouri
|align=left|
|-
|Win
|
|align=left| Earl Abernathy
|TKO
|1
|23/01/1997
|align=left| The Ambassador, Saint Louis, Missouri
|align=left|
|-
|Loss
|
|align=left| Montell Griffin
|UD
|12
|12/09/1994
|align=left| Great Western Forum, Inglewood, California
|align=left|
|-
|Win
|
|align=left| Jesus Castaneda
|KO
|4
|13/06/1994
|align=left| Great Western Forum, Inglewood, California
|align=left|
|-
|Win
|
|align=left| Tim Knight
|PTS
|6
|12/02/1994
|align=left| America's Center, Saint Louis, Missouri
|align=left|
|-
|Win
|
|align=left|Gino Galliano
|KO
|1
|24/01/1994
|align=left| Saint Louis, Missouri
|align=left|
|-
|Win
|
|align=left| Donnie Penelton
|KO
|1
|15/05/1993
|align=left| Eagles Auditorium, Milwaukee, Wisconsin
|align=left|
|-
|Win
|
|align=left| Ed Kelly
|TKO
|1
|02/03/1993
|align=left| Foxwoods, Mashantucket, Connecticut
|align=left|
|-
|Win
|
|align=left| John "Rocky Young" Williams
|KO
|1
|28/08/1992
|align=left| Trump Plaza Hotel and Casino, Atlantic City, New Jersey
|align=left|
|-
|Win
|
|align=left| Jeff Bowman
|KO
|4
|04/05/1992
|align=left| Bill Harris Arena, Mobile, Alabama
|align=left|
|-
|Win
|
|align=left|Ken Chisholm
|KO
|1
|03/04/1992
|align=left| Trump Plaza Hotel and Casino, Atlantic City, New Jersey
|align=left|
|-
|Win
|
|align=left| Anthony Williams
|KO
|5
|04/10/1991
|align=left| Resorts Casino Hotel, Atlantic City, New Jersey
|align=left|
|-
|Win
|
|align=left| Shawn Jewell
|KO
|3
|11/05/1991
|align=left| Portland, Oregon
|align=left|
|-
|Win
|
|align=left| Jessie Wade
|KO
|1
|25/04/1991
|align=left| Shriner's Auditorium, Mobile, Alabama
|align=left|
|-
|Win
|
|align=left| Bruce Stallworth
|KO
|1
|21/09/1990
|align=left| Clarion Hotel, Saint Louis, Missouri
|align=left|
|-
|Win
|
|align=left| William Knorr
|TKO
|1
|28/07/1990
|align=left| Trump Castle, Atlantic City, New Jersey
|align=left|
|-
|Win
|
|align=left| Jeff Summers
|KO
|1
|16/02/1990
|align=left| Clarion Hotel, Saint Louis, Missouri
|align=left|

References

1966 births
2000 deaths
Middleweight boxers
Winners of the United States Championship for amateur boxers
Deaths by firearm in Missouri
People murdered in Missouri
Male murder victims
Murdered African-American people
Boxers from St. Louis
American male boxers